André Firmenich (26 March 1905 – 21 June 1965) was a Swiss sailor. He competed at the 1936 Summer Olympics, the 1948 Summer Olympics and the 1952 Summer Olympics.

References

External links
 

1905 births
1965 deaths
Swiss male sailors (sport)
Olympic sailors of Switzerland
Sailors at the 1936 Summer Olympics – 6 Metre
Sailors at the 1948 Summer Olympics – 6 Metre
Sailors at the 1952 Summer Olympics – 6 Metre
Sportspeople from Geneva
20th-century Swiss people